The Portland Buddhist Church, located in northwest Portland, Oregon, is listed on the National Register of Historic Places. The church was important to the Japanese-American community that once thrived in Northwest Portland.

See also
 National Register of Historic Places listings in Northwest Portland, Oregon

References

External links
 

1910 establishments in Oregon
Buddhist temples in the United States
Buildings designated early commercial in the National Register of Historic Places
Japanese-American culture in Portland, Oregon
Jōdo Shin temples
20th-century Buddhist temples
National Register of Historic Places in Portland, Oregon
Pearl District, Portland, Oregon
Properties of religious function on the National Register of Historic Places in Oregon
Pure Land temples
Religious buildings and structures completed in 1910
Religious buildings and structures in Portland, Oregon